Playing With Sound is an independent record label founded by David Green. Based in the North West of England, PWS are committed to finding upcoming UK talent.

See also
 List of record labels

References

British record labels
Record labels established in 2015
Indie rock record labels
Alternative rock record labels